Musakhel is a village and the center of Musakhel District, Khost Province, Afghanistan. The town is located within the heartland of the Ahmadzai tribe of Ghilji Pashtuns.

See also
 Khost Province

References

External links

Populated places in Khost Province